George Starr may refer to:

 George Reginald Starr (1904–1980), British mining engineer and agent of the Special Operations Executive
 George E. Starr, late 19th century steamboat
 George Lothrop Starr (1878–1925), Dean of Ontario